Badura or Baďura (Czech/Slovak feminine: Baďurová, Badurová) is a surname. It may refer to the following notable people: 

 Eva Badura-Skoda (1929–2021), Austrian musicologist
 Jan Badura (1907–1975), Polish footballer
 Kateřina Baďurová (born 1982), Czech pole vaulter
 Paul Badura-Skoda (1927–2019), Austrian pianist
 Piotr Badura (born 1995), Polish volleyball player

See also
 

Czech-language surnames
Polish-language surnames
Slovak-language surnames